Rumbia LRT station (SE2) is an elevated Light Rail Transit (LRT) station on the Sengkang LRT line East Loop in Rivervale, Sengkang, Singapore along Rivervale Drive near the junction of Rivervale Crescent. This station is located near Rivervale Mall, some HDB flats and Rivervale Crest.

History

The station opened on 18 January 2003, along with the rest of the Sengkang LRT line East Loop.

On 21 February 2020, transport operator SBS Transit made a police report after it was reported that the lift buttons at the station were spat on. SBS Transit has condemned the incident as an "abhorrent act" and "more than mischief". The lift had already been cleaned and disinfected. This incident was significant especially in light of the COVID-19 virus outbreak in Singapore at that time, and the importance of good personal hygiene and being considerate to others. Three male teenagers were being investigated by the police related to the incident.

References

External links

Railway stations in Singapore opened in 2003
Compassvale
LRT stations in Sengkang
Light Rail Transit (Singapore) stations